Sir Thomas White (1492 – 12 February 1567) was an English cloth merchant, Lord Mayor of London in 1553, and a civic benefactor and founder of St John's College, Oxford.

Biography
Thomas White was born in Reading, Berkshire, the son of William White, a clothier of Reading, and his wife, Mary, daughter of John Kibblewhite of South Fawley, also in Berkshire. He was brought up in London. Sir Thomas was twice married, to Avicia (died 1558) and to Joan. A principal member of the guild of Merchant Taylors, he served as Sheriff of London in 1547, and was elected Lord Mayor of London in 1553.  He was knighted in the same year by Queen Mary I. He was a member of the commission for the trial of Lady Jane Grey.

In 1555, inspired by the example of Thomas Pope, founder of Trinity College, Oxford, White obtained a royal licence for the foundation of St John's College, Oxford, dedicated to the patron saint of the Merchant Taylors and established in the buildings of the dissolved Cistercian College of St Bernard. He was involved in the foundation of Merchant Taylors' School, and made provision that scholars of the college should be nominated from pupils of the school.  He also established scholarships at St John's College, tenable by pupils of Tonbridge School, Bristol Grammar School, Reading School and King Henry VIII School, Coventry, where one of the school's four houses bears his name. He purchased Gloucester Hall and set it up in 1560 as a hall of residence for scholars; this became the basis of the later foundation of Worcester College. As a result of his philanthropy, he was listed in Richard Johnson's Nine Worthies of London in 1592.

Sir Thomas White Loan Charity
The charity was founded in 1542 and is still extant. It gives interest-free loans to aspiring businesspeople in Leicestershire and Rutland. There are several memorials to White in England and he is honoured on Leicester's Clock Tower.

References

Bibliography
 Mark Noble (1784). Memoirs of the Protectorate-house of Cromwell: Deduced from an Early Period, and Continued Down to the Present Time,..., Volume 2, Printed Pearson and Rollason.

External links
 Tudor Place: Sir Thomas White
 Royal Berkshire History: Sir Thomas White
 Sir Thomas White Loan Charity
 The Charity of Sir Thomas White, Warwick

1492 births
1567 deaths
People educated at Reading School
People from Leicester
People from Reading, Berkshire
People associated with St John's College, Oxford

English knights
Knights Bachelor
Sheriffs of the City of London
Worshipful Company of Merchant Taylors
16th-century lord mayors of London
16th-century merchants
16th-century English businesspeople
English merchants
Cloth merchants
Founders of colleges of the University of Oxford
People associated with Worcester College, Oxford